Foston may refer to:

Places
Foston, Derbyshire, England
Foston on the Wolds, East Riding of Yorkshire, England
Foston, Leicestershire, England (deserted)
Foston, Lincolnshire, England
Foston, North Yorkshire, England

People
 Thomas Foston, a Master of University College, Oxford, England (1393–6)